The historical mystery or historical whodunit is a subgenre of two literary genres, historical fiction and mystery fiction. These works are set in a time period considered historical from the author's perspective, and the central plot involves the solving of a mystery or crime (usually murder). Though works combining these genres have existed since at least the early 20th century, many credit Ellis Peters's Cadfael Chronicles (1977–1994) for popularizing what would become known as the historical mystery. The increasing popularity and prevalence of this type of fiction in subsequent decades has spawned a distinct subgenre recognized by the publishing industry and libraries. Publishers Weekly noted in 2010 of the genre, "The past decade has seen an explosion in both quantity and quality. Never before have so many historical mysteries been published, by so many gifted writers, and covering such a wide range of times and places." Editor Keith Kahla concurs, "From a small group of writers with a very specialized audience, the historical mystery has become a critically acclaimed, award-winning genre with a toehold on the New York Times bestseller list."

Since 1999, the British Crime Writers' Association has awarded the CWA Historical Dagger award to novels in the genre. The Left Coast Crime conference has presented its Bruce Alexander Memorial Historical Mystery award (for mysteries set prior to 1950) since 2004.

Origins
Though the term "whodunit" was coined sometime in the early 1930s, it has been argued that the detective story itself has its origins as early as the 429 BC Sophocles play Oedipus Rex and the 10th century tale "The Three Apples" from One Thousand and One Nights (Arabian Nights). During China's Ming dynasty (1368–1644), gong'an ("crime-case") folk novels were written in which government magistrates—primarily the historical Di Renjie of the Tang Dynasty (618–907) and Bao Zheng of the Song Dynasty (960–1279)—investigate cases and then as judges determine guilt and punishment. The stories were set in the past but contained many anachronisms. Robert van Gulik came across the 18th century anonymously written Chinese manuscript Di Gong An, in his view closer to the Western tradition of detective fiction than other gong'an tales and so more likely to appeal to non-Chinese readers, and in 1949 published it in English as Celebrated Cases of Judge Dee. He subsequently wrote his own Judge Dee stories (1951–1968) in the same style and time period.

Perhaps the first modern English work that can be classified as both historical fiction and a mystery however is the 1911 Melville Davisson Post story "The Angel of the Lord", which features amateur detective Uncle Abner in pre-American Civil War West Virginia. Barry Zeman of the Mystery Writers of America calls the Uncle Abner short stories "the starting point for true historical mysteries." In the 22 Uncle Abner tales Post wrote between 1911 and 1928, the character puzzles out local mysteries with his keen observation and knowledge of the Bible. It was not until 1943 that American mystery writer Lillian de la Torre did something similar in the story "The Great Seal of England", casting 18th century literary figures Samuel Johnson and James Boswell into Sherlock Holmes and Dr. Watson roles in what would become the first of her Dr. Sam: Johnson, Detector series of stories. In 1944, Agatha Christie published Death Comes as the End, a mystery novel set in ancient Egypt and the first full-length historical whodunit. In 1950, John Dickson Carr published the second full-length historical mystery novel called The Bride of Newgate, set at the close of the Napoleonic Wars.

Popularization
In 1970 Peter Lovesey began a series of novels featuring Sergeant Cribb, a Victorian-era police detective, and Elizabeth Peters's Amelia Peabody series (1975–2010) followed the adventures of the titular Victorian lady/archaeologist as she solved mysteries surrounding her excavations in early 20th century Egypt. But historical mystery stories remained an oddity until the late 1970s, with the success of Ellis Peters and her Cadfael Chronicles (1977–1994), featuring Benedictine monk Brother Cadfael and set in 12th century Shrewsbury. Umberto Eco's one-off The Name of the Rose (1980) also helped popularize the concept, and starting in 1979, author Anne Perry wrote two series of Victorian era mysteries featuring Thomas Pitt (1979–2013) and William Monk (1990–2013). However it was not until about 1990 that the genre's popularity expanded significantly with works such as Lindsey Davis's Falco and Flavia Albia novels (1989–2022), set in the Roman Empire of Vespasian; John Maddox Roberts's SPQR series (1990–2010) and Steven Saylor's Roma Sub Rosa novels (1991–2018), both set in the Roman Republic in the 1st century BC; and Paul Doherty's various series, including the Hugh Corbett medieval mysteries (1986–2010), the Sorrowful Mysteries of Brother Athelstan (1991–2012), and the Canterbury Tales of Mystery and Murder (1994–2012). For Mike Ashley'sThe Mammoth Book of Historical Detectives (1995), F. Gwynplaine MacIntyre wrote "Death in the Dawntime", a locked room mystery (or rather, sealed cave mystery) set in Australia around 35,000 BC, which Ashley suggests is the furthest in the past a historical mystery has been set to date. Diana Gabaldon began the Lord John series in 1998, casting a recurring secondary character from her Outlander series, Lord John Grey, as a nobleman-military officer-amateur detective in 18th century England. Using the pen name Ariana Franklin, Diana Norman wrote four Mistress of the Art of Death novels between 2007 and 2010, featuring 12th-century English medical examiner Adelia Aguilar.

Publishers Weekly noted in 2010 of the genre, "The past decade has seen an explosion in both quantity and quality. Never before have so many historical mysteries been published, by so many gifted writers, and covering such a wide range of times and places." Editor Keith Kahla concurs, "From a small group of writers with a very specialized audience, the historical mystery has become a critically acclaimed, award-winning genre with a toehold on the New York Times bestseller list."

Awards
In 1999, the British Crime Writers' Association awarded the first CWA Historical Dagger award to a novel in the genre. The award was called the Ellis Peters Historical Dagger through 2012. In 2014, Endeavour Press supported the award, which is called the Endeavour Historical Dagger for the 2014 and 2015 awards. The Left Coast Crime conference has presented its Bruce Alexander Memorial Historical Mystery award (for mysteries set prior to 1950) since 2004.

Variations
In an early twist of the genre, Josephine Tey's The Daughter of Time (1951) features a modern police detective who alleviates an extended hospital stay by investigating the 15th century case of Richard III of England and the Princes in the Tower. Georgette Heyer's The Talisman Ring (1936), set in 1793 England, is a Regency romance with elements of mystery that Jane Aiken Hodge called "very nearly a detective story in period costume". Many of Heyer's other historical romances have thriller elements but to a much lesser extent.

Other variations include mystery novels set in alternate history timelines or even fantasy worlds. These would include The Ultimate Solution (1973) by Eric Norden and Fatherland (1992) by Robert Harris, both being police procedurals set in alternate timelines where the Nazis won World War II; Randall Garrett's Lord Darcy series, taking place in a 20th-century in which magic is possible; and Phyllis Ann Karr's The Idylls of the Queen (1982), set in King Arthur's court as depicted in Arthurian myth and with no attempt at historical accuracy.

The genre would not include fiction which was contemporary at the time of writing, such as Arthur Conan Doyle's canonical Sherlock Holmes works set in Victorian England, or the Lord Peter Wimsey books by Dorothy L. Sayers set in the Interwar period. However, subsequent Holmes and Wimsey books written by other authors decades later could arguably be classified as historical mysteries.

List of fictional historical detectives

The following list consists of fictional historical detectives in chronological order of their time period setting:

References

External links
 The Detective and the Toga, a listing/guide for Ancient Roman mysteries
 The Historical Novel Society, an international organization for historical fiction writers and readers

 
Historical novels subgenres
Literary genres
Mystery fiction

zh:推理小說#歷史推理